Gionges is a former commune in the Marne department in north-eastern France. On 1 January 2018, it was merged into the new commune of Blancs-Coteaux.

See also
Communes of the Marne department

References 

Former communes of Marne (department)